Buttons and War is the third EP released by electronica band Psapp.

Track listing

Personnel
Carim Clasmann
Galia Durant

Notes
"About Fun" and "Velvet Pony" were later released on Tiger, My Friend.
"Feel the Fur" was later released on Early Cats and Tracks Volume 2.

External links
Psapp official website 
Psapp at Domino Records

Psapp albums
2004 EPs